Professor Stefano Montaldo (born 1969) is an Italian mathematician working at the University of Cagliari in the fields of differential geometry and global analysis.  Montaldo is well known for his research on biharmonic maps.

Montaldo earned his Ph.D. from the University of Leeds in 1996, under the supervision of John C. Wood.

References

External links
 Home Page at University of Cagliari
 Profile at Zentralblatt MATH 
 Profile at Google Scholar

1969 births
Living people
20th-century  Italian mathematicians
21st-century  Italian mathematicians
Alumni of the University of Leeds
Academic staff of the University of Cagliari